Sainte-Marthe is a municipality located in the Vaudreuil-Soulanges Regional County Municipality of Quebec, Canada. The population as of the 2021 Canadian census was 1,014.

The local economy is based almost exclusively on agriculture.

History
Settlement began in 1835 with the arrival of Irish immigrants. In 1846, the parish was founded and named after Martha, the sister of Lazarus, since the neighbouring parish was called Saint-Lazare.

That same year, the Municipality of Sainte Marthe was created out of the Municipality of Rigaud, but abolished on September 1, 1847. In 1851, its post office opened. On July 1, 1855, the municipality was reestablised, which became a parish municipality in 1857.

In 1928, the village itself separated from the surrounding rural parish and became the Village Municipality of Sainte-Marthe.

On December 27, 1980, the parish and village merged to form the Municipality of Sainte-Marthe.

Demographics

Language

Local government

List of former mayors (since formation of current municipality):
 Léon-Henri Bourbonnais (1980–1984)
 Joseph Antoine Wilfrid Germain Roy (1984–1994)
 Joseph Aimé Jean Guy Durocher (1994–2005)
 Aline Guillotte (2005–2017)
 François Pleau (2017–present)

Education
Commission Scolaire des Trois-Lacs operates Francophone schools.
 École Sainte-Marthe

Lester B. Pearson School Board operates Anglophone schools.
 Soulanges Elementary School in Saint-Télesphore or Evergreen Elementary and Forest Hill Elementary (Junior Campus and Senior campus) in Saint-Lazare

See also
 List of municipalities in Quebec

References

External links

Municipalities in Quebec
Incorporated places in Vaudreuil-Soulanges Regional County Municipality